The Gongota Agreement of 1920 ((lit. Memorandum of establishing buffer state)) was a milestone in the Russian Civil War in Transbaikal. The Agreement was finalized at Gongota railway station on July 15, 1920 between the Far Eastern Republic's delegation headed by Alexander Krasnoshchyokov and Genrich Eiche and the Japanese Expeditionary Corps under Yui Mitsue. The Far Eastern Republic's demands were the evacuation of White Army troops from the zone held by the Japanese forces and the end of hostilities between the Soviets and Japan.

The process was not easy for the Far Eastern Republic authorities because the Japanese tried to postpone their evacuation from the region. Finally, the Japanese agreed stopping military actions against the FER troops and partisans. A no man's line was created west of Chita and it helped the Far Eastern Republic launch the final operation of taking Chita.

History of Zabaykalsky Krai
Russian Civil War
Allied intervention in the Russian Civil War
1920 in Russia
Treaties concluded in 1920
Treaties of the Empire of Japan
Treaties of the Russian Soviet Federative Socialist Republic
Japan–Russia relations
Japan–Soviet Union relations